Puts may refer to:

 Put option, a stock market instrument
 Naked put
 People Under The Stairs, an American hip hop group
 puts(), a simple function in the C programming language that writes a string to stdout
 Premonitory Urge for Tics Scale, a measurement to assess urges in tic disorders

People with the surname
 Jesse Puts (born 1994), Dutch competitive swimmer
 Kevin Puts (born 1972), American composer

See also
 fputs()
 printf()
 
 Put (disambiguation)
 Putsch, a term for coup d'état